CKUV-FM is a Canadian radio station being licensed to Okotoks, Alberta, serving the Foothills region broadcasting at 100.9 FM. The station currently broadcasts a hot adult contemporary format branded as The Eagle 100.9. The station first began broadcasting in 2003. The station is currently owned by Golden West Broadcasting.

The station held the call sign CFXL-FM until June 2008, when it adopted its current call sign. The former CIQX-FM in Calgary took over the "CFXL-FM" call sign a few days later.

The Eagle also operates a local news portal called Okotoks Online and provides local news and coverage for Okotoks and surrounding area.

References

External links
The Eagle 100.9
 
 

Kuv
Kuv
Radio stations established in 2003
Okotoks
2003 establishments in Alberta